Atatürk is an honorific surname given to Mustafa Kemal Atatürk, the founder of modern Turkey.

Atatürk may also refer to:

 Atatürk Airport, the airport in Istanbul, named after him
 Atatürk Centennial
 Atatürk Cultural Center, Istanbul
 Atatürk Cup, a former football competition
 Atatürk Dam, southeastern Turkey
 Atatürk Forest, Israel
 Atatürk High School of Science, Istanbul
 Atatürk International Airport, Istanbul
 Atatürk Museum (disambiguation)
 Atatürk Olympic Stadium, Istanbul
  Atatürk Square, Ashgabat
 Atatürk Square, Nicosia
 Atatürk University, Erzurum
 Atatürk Government Model High School, Bangladesh